Kevin Flynn is the name of:

 Kevin Flynn (politician) (born 1955), Canadian politician
 Kevin Flynn (hurler) (born 1976), Irish hurler
 Kevin Flynn (character), protagonist of the film Tron and its sequel Tron: Legacy
 Kevin Flynn (journalist), New York Times journalist and author
 Kevin Flynn (rugby union) (1939–2022), Irish rugby union player